The Ruse trolleybus system is a part of the public transport network of the city and municipality of Ruse, the fifth most populous in Bulgaria. Opened in 1988, the system currently has seven lines and forms the backbone of the city's transport system. Its approximate length is 63 km and has been designed to work with 600V DC electricity. Over the years, various models of trolleybuses have been operated in Ruse.

History

The first trolleybus in the city of Ruse departed in 1988, along the route starting from the Western Industrial Zone. Lines were operated using ZiU trolleybuses. In the following years, as the city was developing, the cable network was extended throughout the central areas and the industrial zones, replacing many bus routes with trolleybuses.

It was announced on November 1, 2008 that Ruse municipality had signed a concession agreement with the Bulgarian branch of the Israeli transport company Egged. Under the concession, management of the trolleybus network in the city became the responsibility of the private Egged Ruse transport holding. In 2015, around 70% of the overhead wire network was replaced under the integrated urban transport project. Work also included the replacement of damaged trolleybus pillars and their repainting. It was during this period that conductor service was discontinued for all trolleybus lines as a permanent cost-cutting measure.  Passengers instead purchase subscription and prepaid cards or a single-use ticket directly from the driver. After nearly nine years of operating under a private holding and low overall profitability, the trolleybus transport entity was once again transferred to the local municipality on August 31, 2017. 

Throughout the city, new switches equipped with automatic remote control functionality were installed in 2022 to replace outdated infrastructure and enhance trolleybus performance. Public tenders have also been launched for the refurbishment of overhead wires between the central railway station and the gray mill.

Services
Today, the Ruse trolleybus network has 7 lines:

Fleet

Current fleet

The main short-term goal for Ruse municipality has been to ensure the operation of the trolleybus system. For this purpose, 12 Skoda and 5 NAW/Lauber trolleybuses in used condition were purchased to supplement the local fleet of aging vehicles in 2019. Determined to be most suitable for the current needs of the city, a further 20 NAW/Lauber vehicles were acquired by early 2022. Ruse is expected to receive 15 new trolleybuses from Czech manufacturer SOR Libchavy by the end of 2023.

Past fleet

During the early years of the network, solely ZiU trolleys were used. Retired trolleybuses from the Swiss cities of Basel, Bern, and Winterthur were then introduced to the network in the late 1990s. The entire stock of vehicles, consisting of Soviet built ZiU and former Swiss trolleybuses, was replaced in several stages between 2008 and 2013 with second-hand trolleybuses from various European countries. Many of these vehicles have also been retired since the reacquisition of the transport holding by the local municipality, some remain in operation.

See also

Ruse Central railway station
List of trolleybus systems

References

External links

 Trolleybus city: Ruse (Bulgaria) Trolleymotion.
 

Ruse, Bulgaria
Ruse
Ruse